Kansas's 40th Senate district is one of 40 districts in the Kansas Senate. It has been represented by Republican Rick Billinger since 2017, succeeding fellow Republican Ralph Ostmeyer.

Geography
District 40 covers a vast swath of rural northwestern Kansas, including all of Cheyenne, Decatur, Ellis, Gove, Graham, Logan, Norton, Rawlins, Sheridan, Sherman, Thomas, Trego, and Wallace Counties and part of Phillips County. Communities in the district include Hays, Colby, Goodland, Norton, Ellis, Oakley, WaKeeney, Oberlin, St. Francis, Hill City, Hoxie, and Atwood.

The district is located entirely within Kansas's 1st congressional district, and overlaps with the 110th, 111th, 118th, and 120th districts of the Kansas House of Representatives. It borders the states of Nebraska and Colorado. At nearly 13,000 square miles, it is by far the largest legislative district in the state.

Recent election results

2020

2016

2012
Republican 40th district incumbent Ralph Ostmeyer and Democratic 36th district incumbent Allen Schmidt were redistricted into the same district in 2012.

Federal and statewide results in District 40

References

40
Cheyenne County, Kansas
Decatur County, Kansas
Ellis County, Kansas
Gove County, Kansas
Graham County, Kansas
Logan County, Kansas
Norton County, Kansas
Phillips County, Kansas
Rawlins County, Kansas
Sheridan County, Kansas
Sherman County, Kansas
Thomas County, Kansas
Trego County, Kansas
Wallace County, Kansas